William Humphrey (15 September 1843 – 24 February 1918) was an English first-class cricketer. Humphrey was a right-handed batsman who bowled right-arm roundarm fast.

Humphrey made his first-class debut for Surrey against Sussex in 1864. Humphrey represented Surrey in four first-class matches in 1864, the last of which came against Nottinghamshire. For the second half of the 1864 season, Humphrey joined Hampshire where he made his debut for the county against Sussex in Hampshire County Cricket Club's first first-class match. Humphrey made four first-class appearances for Hampshire, with his final first-class appearance for the club coming in the same season against Middlesex.

In 1865 Humphrey represented Norfolk in two non first-class matches against the Marylebone Cricket Club.

Humphrey died at Norwich, Norfolk on 24 February 1918.

Family
Humphrey's brothers Richard, Thomas and John all played first-class cricket.

External links
William Humphrey at Cricinfo
William Humphrey at CricketArchive

1843 births
1918 deaths
People from Mitcham
People from Surrey
English cricketers
Surrey cricketers
Hampshire cricketers